The 1st Parliament of King James I was summoned by King James I on 31 January 1604 and assembled on 19 March following. It was known as the Blessed Parliament and took place in five sessions, interrupted by Holy Days and the Gunpowder Plot. The speaker was Edward Phelips, the Member of Parliament for Somerset.

King James' objective from the first session of his first Parliament after taking the English throne in addition to that of Scotland was to bring about a statutory union of the two countries. As he said, he did not wish to be "a husband to two wives". However the House of Commons rejected the proposal on the grounds that it would affect English Common Law, and when James sought legal help, he found the judges agreed with Parliament. He was also denied funds as the subsidy was still being collected.

Parliament re-assembled for the second session on 5 November 1605, which was postponed until 6 January 1606 because of the Gunpowder Plot. A bill to outlaw purveyance, whereby the Royal Household could  obtain goods by right at reduced prices, was thwarted by the House of Lords. However legislation was successively enacted to prohibit Englishmen from serving in the Spanish armed forces, then at war with the Dutch. The Spanish Company, a trading company which claimed a monopoly on trade with Spain, was also suppressed. In reaction to the Gunpowder Plot, King James was granted subsidies then worth £400,000.

The third session (November 1606 to July 1607) returned to the issue of union between England and Scotland, but only agreed to abolish some medieval laws dealing with Anglo-Scottish hostilities.

The fourth session, delayed by plague and King James' reluctance, met on 9 February 1610. Robert Cecil, 1st Earl of Salisbury, the Lord Treasurer, informed the House that the King needed £600,000 to clear his debts and modernise the Navy. In addition, he proposed a new annual subsidy for the Royal Household of £200,000, in return for which the King would give up his right of purveyance and other historic privileges. After some negotiation a deal was agreed and members left for the summer to consult their constituents on the issue.

The fifth and final session met on 16 October 1610. Support for the "Great Contract" negotiated in the previous session to guarantee the King's finances ran into difficulties over specific taxes the King was imposing on trade and the Commons withdrew from the deal. The King's patience had by now run out. Although initially intended that Parliament should reconvene on 9 February 1611, the King's anger was so great that on 31 December he issued a Proclamation dissolving the assembly, therefore nicknamed "Blessed Parliament".

The Parliament was officially dissolved on 9 February 1611.

Notable Acts passed in the Parliament
 Popish Recusants Act 1605
 Presentation of Benefices Act 1605
 Shop-books Evidence Act 1609
 Crown Debts Act 1609
 Assuring and establishing the Isle of Man

See also
 List of MPs elected to the English parliament in 1604
 Acts of the Blessed Parliament
 List of parliaments of England

References

 

1604 establishments in England
1604 in politics
Parliaments of James I of England